Kamchia is a village in eastern Bulgaria, located in Sungurlare Municipality of the Burgas Province. It lies on the river Luda Kamchia along the provincial road 7305. It currently does not have its own mayor but instead is governed by the municipal mayor Stefan Kenov.

Villages in Burgas Province